Li Weiwei (born March 1958) is a Chinese politician, serving since 2016 as chairwoman of the Hunan Provincial Committee of the Chinese People's Political Consultative Conference.

Biography 
Li was born in Ningxiang, Hunan. She joined the Chinese Communist Party in 1976. In her youth, she worked in a people's commune in Zhuzhou County. She has a bachelor's degree in Chinese literature from Hunan Normal College. She worked as a teacher upon graduating, before joining the Communist Youth League organization in Zhuzhou.  In 1990 she became deputy secretary of the Hunan provincial Youth League organization. 

In 1995 she was named deputy commissioner (vice-mayor) of Huaihua. In 1997 she became involved in commerce; by 2000 she began working for the China Council for the Promotion of International Trade, Hunan division, becoming its head in 2003. In November 2006 she was named to the provincial Party Standing Committee of Hunan, concurrently head of the Hunan United Front Department. In August 2015, in a provincial leadership reshuffle, she was named Secretary of the Political and Legal Affairs Commission (Zhengfawei) of Hunan province. In January 2016, she became chairwoman of the Hunan Provincial Committee of the Chinese People's Political Consultative Conference, the province's top political advisory body.

Li has an MBA and a doctorate in economics, both from Hunan University.

References

1958 births
Politicians from Changsha
Hunan University alumni
People from Ningxiang
Living people
Chinese women in politics
Members of the 11th Chinese People's Political Consultative Conference
Members of the 12th Chinese People's Political Consultative Conference
Members of the 13th Chinese People's Political Consultative Conference